Aliabad-e Moftabad (also Romanized as ‘Alīābād-e Moftābād; also known as Moftābād) is a village in Qasemabad Rural District, in the Central District of Rafsanjan County, Kerman Province, Iran. At the 2006 census, its population was 252, in 64 families.

References 

Populated places in Rafsanjan County